The Society for Research on Biological Rhythms (SRBR) is an international chronobiological research society with three key goals: (1) to promote the advancement and dissemination of basic and applied research in all aspects of biological rhythms; (2) to enhance the education and training of students and researchers in the field; (3) to foster interdisciplinary communication and an international exchange of ideas. The society holds biennial meetings and informal gatherings, and participates in peer-reviewed science and evidence-based policy making. It is one of four prominent existing Chronology Research Societies and one of the 14 societies that make up The World Federation of Societies for Chronobiology. The organization is currently composed of 1,000 scientists and clinicians dedicated to studying biological rhythms and their impact. The society has its own official journal, the Journal of Biological Rhythms. Through its journal, website, meetings and exchanges the society engages scientists of all backgrounds and nationalities. It advocates the need for funding in research areas in biological rhythms, such as sleep, and supports other research efforts such as the National Institutes of Health and National Science Foundation.

Founding and Early History 
In 1986, Benjamin Rusak founded the Journal of Biological Rhythms. Rusak wanted an accompanying society that would hold meetings concerning research on biological rhythms, so he asked Fred W. Turek to organize the first meeting. The society was officially founded on November 12, 1986 by Fred Turek, Dave Hudson, Joe Takahashi, and Gene Block. The society is sometimes cited as being founded in 1988, as this was when the first meeting occurred.

Colin Pittendrigh, Turek's Ph.D. adviser, and one of the fathers of the field, was initially opposed to the society, worrying that it would have an isolating effect on the field rather than connecting it to related disciplines. Pittendrigh came around to the idea after the successful first meeting. Turek, however, believed that the field had advanced and diversified enough to justify a meeting that would unify the diverse field. Turek had been involved with the Endocrine Society, a research society that was 70 years old by 1986. He thought about this well established organisation when working in the early phases of SRBR, hoping to create a society with the ability to make a lasting impact. The first meeting was held at the Wild Dunes Resort and Conference Center in Charleston, SC, in May 1988. The Plenary Lecture at the first meeting was given by Michael Menaker.

Meetings 
Meetings for the Society of Research on Biological Rhythms occur once every two years, typically in May or June. The location of the meeting is determined by the President of the SRBR with the help of existing members. Meetings typically last four or five days and are open to all registered members. The meetings serve as a forum to share the latest research in biological rhythms, with hundreds of chronobiologist from around the world presenting at poster sessions and lectures. According to 2016 President Paul Hardin, the meeting is "an exceptional forum for hearing the latest cutting-edge research, reengaging with colleagues from years past, and exchanging ideas that will shape the future of the field with a talented and diverse group of chronobiologists from around the globe."

The last day of the meeting also features a keynote speaker referred to as the Pittendrigh/Aschoff speaker, named after notable chronobiologist Colin Pittendrigh and Jürgen Aschoff. Notable past Pittendrigh/Aschoff speakers include: Fred Turek, Joe Takahashi, and Michael Young.

In addition to lectures and poster sessions, the meeting also serves as an opportunity to review the accomplishments of the society and its members over the previous two years, provide updates on the Journal for Biological Rhythms, introduce the incoming administration, and officially transfer the presidency to the president-elect.

List of meetings

Awards
The Society for Research on Biological Rhythms offers various awards and fellowships to researchers and trainees with diverse backgrounds from all over the world. Researchers and trainees must be participating in SRBR's biennial meeting to be considered.

Travel Fellowships & Awards
 International Travel Fellowships - This fellowship covers part of the travel costs for selected researchers and trainees from international countries. SRBR believes in the invaluable contributions the participation of a diverse group of researchers brings to its meetings. Trainees from economically disadvantaged countries are especially encouraged to apply. 
 Diversity Travel Award - The SRBR provides awards funded by the NIH to cover part of the travel costs for selected researchers and trainees from certain backgrounds. Researchers with disabilities or from underrepresented backgrounds in the chronobiology field are strongly encouraged to apply.
 Trainee Travel Award - The SRBR gives two different awards to trainees based on excellence and merit: the Trainee Research Excellence Award and Trainee Research Merit Award. All submitted abstracts that fulfill criteria are automatically reviewed.

Junior Faculty Research Award
This award is given to principal investigators, usually newly independent researchers, for their exemplary work in the chronobiology field. Those eligible must be principal investigators at the Assistant Professor level (tenure-track) and must have published at least one notable paper on their research as a corresponding author.

Only those nominated by a SRBR member, excluding oneself or former lab members, are considered for this award.

Directors' Award
The SRBR gives Directors' Awards to honor those who have made significant contributions to the chronobiology field through their service, innovative research, and/or mentorship.

Notable Past Award Recipients
A list of notable recipients of some of the awards described above:

Governance
The Society for Research on Biological Rhythms is governed by a board of directors whose members consists of the following:

Board of Directors
Current Executive Committee
 Carla Green, University of Texas Southwestern Medical Center - President
 Erik Herzog, Washington University in St. Louis - President-Elect
 Mary Harrington, Smith College - Treasurer
 Ravi Allada, Northwestern University - Secretary

Members-at-Large
 Chris Colwell, University of California, Los Angeles
 Roelof Hut, University of Groningen, Netherlands
 Diego Golombek, National University of Quilmes, Buenos Aires

Ex officio members 
This is a list of Ex Officio members associated with the society and/or are committee chairs.
 Paul Hardin, Texas A&M University - Past President
 William Schwartz, Dell Medical School at The University of Texas at Austin - Editor, Journal of Biological Rhythms (JBR)
 Horacio de la Iglesia, University of Washington - 2018 Program Chair
 Nico Cermakian, McGill University - 2018 Fundraising Chair
 John Hogenesch, University of Pennsylvania, Perelman School of Medicine - Comptroller
 Ilia Karatsoreos, Washington State University - Professional Development Committee Chair
 Anna Wirz-Justice, University of Basel, Switzerland - ChronoHistory Chair
 Shelley Tischkau, Southern Illinois University School of Medicine - Communications Chair

Membership 
There are about 500 publicly listed members of the SRBR; the 2016 membership reached a record high of 702. All members must engage in research or training programs involving biological rhythms. The SRBR has three tiers of membership options:
 Regular
 Trainee
 Emeritus
Regular Members enjoy benefits such as discounted registration for the SRBR meeting, online access to the Journal of Biological Rhythms and chronobiology teaching materials, and voting rights in SRBR officer and Executive Committee elections. Trainee Members, who must be enrolled in undergraduate, graduate, or postdoctoral training programs, pay lower membership fees than Regular Members, at the cost of forfeiting SRBR voting rights. Trainee Members also have opportunities to participate in Trainee Professional Development Day, dedicated to scientific and career development, and to apply for travel awards to Trainee Day. Emeritus Members must be retired from full-time employment, and must have been Regular Members for at least 10 years. They enjoy similar privileges to Regular Members; however, membership fees will be waived after 10 years of Emeritus Member status.

Notable Members 
Notable SRBR members, and their select contributions to chronobiology, include:
 Serge Daan: theoretical modeling of circadian systems and human sleep regulation
 Jay Dunlap: cloning frq, the first clock gene identified in a non-animal system, in Neurospora; collaboration with Jennifer Loros
 Susan Golden: identification of cyanobacterial clock genes kaiA, kaiB, and kaiC; collaboration with Takao Kondo (see below)
 Carla Green: circadian regulation of metabolism
 Erik Herzog: discovery of vasoactive intestinal polypeptide as a coupling factor in the mammalian clock
 Takao Kondo: identification of cyanobacterial clock genes kaiA, kaiB, and kaiC; collaboration with Susan Golden (see above)
 Michael Menaker: discovery of extra-retinal photoreceptors in the house sparrow
Steven M. Reppert: discovery of clock functions of Cry1, Cry 2, mPer1, and mPer2
Michael Rosbash: identification of a Drosophila CLOCK mutant
 Satchidananda Panda: discovery of non-image-forming functions of melanopsin
 Ueli Schibler: discovery of circadian clocks in mammalian peripheral tissue
 Amita Sehgal: discovery of the timeless Drosophila mutant
 William J. Schwartz: demonstration of SCN rhythmicity using a functional marker, 2-deoxyglucose
 Paul Taghert: discovery of PDF's function as a coupling factor in the Drosophila clock
 Joseph Takahashi: identification of the mammalian clock gene
 Fred W. Turek: molecular basis behind sleep/wake cycle and circadian rhythms; seasonal reproductive cycles

Publications

Journal of Biological Rhythms 
The Journal of Biological Rhythms has been the official journal for the Society for Research on Biological Rhythms since the founding of both in 1986. The JBR publishes scholarly articles, original research, and reviews on a variety of topics all centering around periodicity in organisms. The journal focuses on circadian and seasonal rhythms, but articles about other biological periods are published as well. A variety of approaches are explored by the journal including: genetic, behavioral, modeling, and clinical trials. In 2015 SAGE Publications gave JBR a five-year impact factor of 3.167 and a ranking of 19/86 in biology. The impact rating is a measure of how frequently the average article from the journal is cited. JBR is a member of the Committee on Publication Ethics.

JBRish 
JBRish is a collection of editorials and letters written by Martin Zatz while he was editor of the Journal of Biological Rhythms. These are not scholarly articles about the science of biological rhythms; instead they focus on various aspects of life in academia and science. Some pieces are comedic or satirical in nature, and others are more serious. The collectors of the pieces, Anna Wirz-Justice and Irving Zucker, describe the selections as, “wistful, others poignant or trenchant, and an occasional one offers advice. They not infrequently document and lampoon trends and human foibles.”

Newsletter 
The Society for Research on Biological Rhythms publishes a newsletter two to three times a year. It contains a letter from the President of the society, recent developments in the field, and society business. The society business often includes programs for meetings, recent grants, and newsworthy events involving members. Recent newsletters can be viewed by non-members and can be found on the SRBR's website.

References

Chronobiology
Circadian rhythm